Mattawan is a village in Antwerp Township, Van Buren County of the U.S. state of Michigan.  The population was 1,997 at the 2010 census.

Geography

Demographics

2010 census
As of the census of 2010, there were 1,997 people, 788 households, and 533 families living in the village. The racial makeup of the village was 93.9% White, 2.2% African American, 0.6% Native American, 0.3% Asian, 0.4% from other races, and 2.7% from two or more races. Hispanic or Latino of any race were 3.9% of the population.

There were 788 households, of which 37.8% had children under the age of 18 living with them, 45.2% were married couples living together, 16.4% had a female householder with no husband present, 6.1% had a male householder with no wife present, and 32.4% were non-families. 27.2% of all households were made up of individuals, and 9.4% had someone living alone who was 65 years of age or older. The average household size was 2.53 and the average family size was 3.06.

The median age in the village was 36.5 years. 27.6% of residents were under the age of 18; 8.8% were between the ages of 18 and 24; 25.2% were from 25 to 44; 27% were from 45 to 64; and 11.5% were 65 years of age or older. The gender makeup of the village was 47.0% male and 53.0% female.

2000 census
As of the census of 2000, there were 2,536 people, 961 households, and 711 families living in the village. The racial makeup of the village was 94.16% White, 1.89% African American, 0.35% Native American, 0.32% Asian, 1.22% from other races, and 2.05% from two or more races. Hispanic or Latino of any race were 3.12% of the population.

There were 961 households, out of which 42.5% had children under the age of 18 living with them, 52.0% were married couples living together, 16.1% had a female householder with no husband present, and 26.0% were non-families. 21.0% of all households were made up of individuals, and 7.4% had someone living alone who was 65 years of age or older.  The average household size was 2.64 and the average family size was 3.04.

In the village, the population was spread out, with 30.0% under the age of 18, 9.4% from 18 to 24, 31.2% from 25 to 44, 20.8% from 45 to 64, and 8.6% who were 65 years of age or older.  The median age was 33 years. For every 100 females, there were 92.7 males.  For every 100 females age 18 and over, there were 90.5 males.

The median income for a household in the village was $88,241, and the median income for a family was $98,259. Males had a median income of $75,967 versus $64,647 for females. The per capita income for the village was $67,971.  About 3.2% of families and 3.8% of the population were below the poverty line, including .8% of those under age 18 and 1.6% of those age 65 or over.

Education

Education in the village of Mattawan is provided by the Mattawan Consolidated School District (K-12), which consists of the Early Elementary School (grades K-2), the Later Elementary School (grades 3–5), the Middle School (grades 6–8), and the High School (grades 9-12).

The Mattawan Consolidated School system is unusual because it is a unified campus. All of the school buildings and sports facilities are on one campus.

Notable people
The San Francisco Twins
Chris Ballingall, professional baseball player
Noah Herron, running back for the Green Bay Packers of the National Football League
Andy Roach, professional hockey player for the St. Louis Blues of the National Hockey League

References

External links
Village of Mattawan, Michigan official site
Mattawan Consolidated School District Official Site

Villages in Van Buren County, Michigan
Villages in Michigan
Kalamazoo–Portage metropolitan area